The 2000–01 British Collegiate American Football League season was the 16th full season of the BCAFL, organised by the British Students American Football Association (BSAFA, now the BAFA).

Changes from last season
Division Changes
There were no changes to the Divisional setup

Team Changes
Dundee Bluedevils withdrew after one season
Lancaster Bombers moved within the Norther Conference from Eastern to Scottish Division(!)
University of Sheffield rejoined the Northern Conference after three seasons away, as the Sabres
Teesside Demons changed their name to the Cougars
This meant the number of teams in BCAFL stayed at 27.

Regular season

Northern Conference, Scottish Division

Northern Conference, Eastern Division

Northern Conference, Central Division

Southern Conference, Eastern Division

Southern Conference, Central Division

Southern Conference, Western Division

Playoffs

Note – the table does not indicate who played home or away in each fixture.

References

External links
 Official BUAFL Website
 Official BAFA Website

2000
2001 in British sport
2000 in British sport
2001 in American football
2000 in American football